Dangavo is a village in the Bamingui-Bangoran Prefecture of the northern Central African Republic.

Populated places in Bamingui-Bangoran
Bamingui